Cherokee Uprising is a 1950 American Western film directed by Lewis D. Collins and written by Daniel B. Ullman. The film stars Whip Wilson, Andy Clyde, Lois Hall, Sam Flint, Forrest Taylor, Marshall Reed, Iron Eyes Cody and Chief Yowlachie. The film was released on October 8, 1950, by Monogram Pictures.

Plot

Cast
Whip Wilson as Bob Foster
Andy Clyde as Jake Jones
Lois Hall as Mary Lou Harrison
Sam Flint as Judge Harrison
Forrest Taylor as William Welch
Marshall Reed as Sheriff Joe Conger
Iron Eyes Cody as Longknife
Chief Yowlachie as Gray Eagle
Lee Roberts as Kansas
Stanley Price as Smokey
Lyle Talbot as Chief Marshal
Edith Mills as Mrs. Strongbow

References

External links
 

1950 films
1950s English-language films
American Western (genre) films
1950 Western (genre) films
Monogram Pictures films
Films directed by Lewis D. Collins
American black-and-white films
1950s American films